Alabama & Friends is a tribute album to American country rock group Alabama. It was released on August 27, 2013 via Show Dog-Universal Music. The album includes two new tracks, "That's How I Was Raised" and "All American," performed by Alabama.

The album debuted at No. 8 on the Billboard 200 and No. 2 on the Top Country Albums, selling 32,000 copies in the United States in the first week.

The artists on the album also later performed a tribute concert in Nashville, Tennessee at the historic Ryman Auditorium. The show was filmed, and the film was released on 2-disc DVD, titled "Alabama & Friends – At The Ryman", on September 30, 2014 via Eagle Rock Entertainment.

Track listing

Personnel

Alabama
 Jeff Cook – electric guitar, background vocals, producer
 Teddy Gentry – bass guitar, background vocals, producer
 Randy Owen – acoustic guitar, electric guitar, lead vocals, background vocals, producer

Additional Musicians

 Tim Akers – Hammond B-3 organ, piano
 Jason Aldean – lead vocals on "Tennessee River"
 Kurt Allison – electric guitar
 David Angell – violin
 Richard Bennett – electric guitar
 Luke Bryan – lead vocals on "Love in the First Degree"
 Pat Buchanan – electric guitar
 Tom Bukovac – electric guitar
 John Catchings – cello
 Kenny Chesney – lead vocals on "Lady Down on Love"
 Jason Cope – electric guitar
 J.T. Corenflos – electric guitar
 Mark Crum – bass guitar
 Eric Darken – percussion
 David Davidson – violin
 Jay DeMarcus – bass guitar and background vocals on "Old Flame"
 Mike Eli – acoustic guitar and lead vocals on "The Closer You Get"
 Shawn Fichter – drums
 Johnny Garcia – electric guitar
 Kenny Greenberg – electric guitar
 Tony Harrell – keyboards
 Chris Hennessee – harmonica
 Wes Hightower – background vocals
 Tyler Hubbard – lead vocals on "I'm in a Hurry (And Don't Know Why)
 Jamey Johnson – acoustic guitar and lead vocals on "My Home's in Alabama"
 Jon Jones – bass guitar and background vocals on "The Closer You Get"
 Charlie Judge – Hammond B-3 organ, piano, synthesizer
 Toby Keith – lead vocals on "She and I"
 Brian Kelley – background vocals on "I'm in a Hurry (And Don't Know Why)"
 Tully Kennedy – bass guitar
 Anthony LaMarchina – cello
 Gary LeVox – lead vocals on "Old Flame"
 Joey Moi – acoustic guitar, electric guitar
 Greg Morrow – drums, percussion
 Steve Nathan – keyboards
 Mary Kathryn Van Osdale – violin
 Larry Paxton – bass guitar
 Ethan Pilzer – bass guitar
 Chris Powell – drums
 Gary Prim – synthesizer
 Danny Rader – acoustic guitar, electric guitar
 Rich Redmond – drums, percussion
 Mike Reid – piano
 Michael Rhodes – bass guitar
 Jim Riley – drums
 Mike Rojas – Hammond B-3 organ, keyboards, piano
 Joe Don Rooney – electric guitar and background vocals on "Old Flame"
 John Scott – piano, synthesizer strings
 Steve Sheehan – acoustic guitar
 Adam Shoenfeld – electric guitar
 Pam Sixfin – violin
 Jimmie Lee Sloas – bass guitar
 Bryan Sutton – acoustic guitar
 Chris Thompson – drums on "The Closer You Get"
 Ilya Toshinsky – banjo, dobola, acoustic guitar, electric guitar, mandolin
 Wanda Vick – fiddle
 Roger Weismeyer – oboe
 Kristin Wilkinson – viola
 John Willis – acoustic guitar
 Trisha Yearwood – lead vocals on "Forever's as Far as I'll Go"
 James Young – electric guitar and background vocals on "The Closer You Get"

Production

 Derek Bason – engineer, mixing
 Drew Bollman – production assistant
 Buddy Cannon – producer
 T.W. Cargile –  engineer, mixing, overdubs
 Tony Castle – engineer
 Peter Coleman – engineer, mixing
 Mickey Jack Cones – editing
 Scott Cooke –  digital editing
 Juanita Copeland – production assistant
 Jay DeMarcus – Producer
 Richard Dodd – mastering
 Leland Elliott –  production assistant
 Charles English – engineer
 Brandon Epps – digital editing, editing
 Shannon Finnegan – production assistant
 Fletcher Foster – executive producer
 Garth Fundis – producer
 Shalacy Griffin – production assistant
 Mike "Frog" Griffith – production assistant
 Schatzi Hageman – publicity
 Gordon Hammond – engineer
 Carie Higdon – project coordinator
 Alex Jarvis – production assistant, digital editing
 Jamey Johnson – producer
 Scott Johnson – production assistant
 Toby Keith – producer
 Michael Knox – producer
 Stephen Lamb – copyist
 Miles Logan – engineer, mixing
 Sam Martin – production assistant
 Joey Moi – engineer, mixing, producer, programming
 Natalie Moore – art direction
 Sean Neff – engineer, mixing
 Justin Niebank – mixing
 Taylor Nyquist – production assistant
 Ernesto Olvera – production assistant
 Alison Owen – photography
 Evan Owen – production assistant
 Susannah Parrish – art direction, design
 Ronnie Pinnell – production assistant
 Rich Redmond – drum programming
 Lowell Reynolds – production assistant
 Ed Seay – engineer, mixing
 Harold Shedd – producer
 Chris Small – production assistant
 Jarod Snowden – production assistant
 Mike Stankiewicz – production assistant
 Jeff Stevens – producer
 Gaines Sturdivant – project manager
 Todd Tidwell – production assistant
 Kristin Wilkinson – string arrangements
 Hank Williams Jr. – mastering 
 Mark Wright – executive producer

Charts

Weekly charts

Year-end charts

References

2013 albums
Alabama (American band)
Country albums by American artists
Show Dog-Universal Music albums
Tribute albums